Wenatchee National Forest is a U.S. National Forest located in Washington. With an area of 1,735,394 acres (2,711.55 sq mi, or 7,022.89 km²), it extends about 137 miles along the eastern slopes of the Cascade Range of Washington, USA from Okanogan National Forest to Gifford Pinchot National Forest. The forest is located in Chelan, Kittitas and Yakima counties.

Wilderness areas
There are six officially designated wilderness areas within Wenatchee National Forest that are part of the National Wilderness Preservation System. All of them lie partially in neighboring National Forests (as indicated).
 Alpine Lakes Wilderness (partly in Snoqualmie NF)
 Glacier Peak Wilderness (partly in Mount Baker NF)
 Goat Rocks Wilderness (mostly in Gifford Pinchot NF)
 Henry M. Jackson Wilderness (partly in Snoqualmie NF (46.2%); Mount Baker NF (27.2%))
 Lake Chelan-Sawtooth Wilderness (mostly in Okanogan NF)
 William O. Douglas Wilderness (partly in Gifford Pinchot NF)

Waptus Lake 

Nearly two miles long and accessible only by hiking or horse trails, Waptus Lake is the largest Alpine lake in the National Forest. Drained by the Waptus River, it is notable for its views of Summit Chief and Bears Breast mountains.

Administration
The Okanogan and Wenatchee National Forests are managed together as the Okanogan-Wenatchee National Forest with headquarters in Wenatchee, Washington. There are local ranger district offices located in Chelan, Cle Elum, Entiat, Methow Valley, Naches, Tonasket, and Wenatchee River. The first forest supervisor of Wenatchee National Forest was Albert H. Sylvester, who named over a thousand natural features in the region.

Ecology

Wildfires are not uncommon in the National Forest. In September 2012, a severe lightning storm ignited hundreds of fires, the largest of which were located southwest of the city of Wenatchee and east of Blewett Pass. Significant wildfires occurred again in July 2014, in the Chiwaukum and Entiat Mountains. A lightning strike near Jolly Mountain on August 11, 2017 ultimately burned more than 38,000 acres and forced significant evacuations.

References

External links

Okanogan-Wenatchee National Forest U.S. Forest Service

 
Cascade Range
Protected areas of Chelan County, Washington
Protected areas of Kittitas County, Washington
National Forests of Washington (state)
Protected areas established in 1908
1908 establishments in Washington (state)